Manuel António Cardoso Leal (born April 7, 1983 in Paços de Ferreira) is a Portuguese former professional road bicycle racer, who competed professionally between 2006 and 2015 for the , , , ,  and  teams. He made his Grand Tour debut in the 2010 Tour de France, but had to pull out after the Prologue due to injuries sustained in a crash.

Major results

2006
 1st Stage 2 Volta a Portugal
 5th Overall Grande Prémio Internacional Costa Azul
2007
 Vuelta a Extremadura
1st Points classification
1st Stages 4 & 5
2008
 1st Stage 3 Vuelta a la Comunidad de Madrid
 Volta ao Alentejo
1st Stages 2 & 5
 Volta ao Distrito de Santarém
1st Stages 1 & 4
2009
 1st  Road race, National Road Championships
 1st Stage 1 Volta a Portugal
 Troféu Joaquim Agostinho
1st Stages 1 & 4
 1st Stage 1 GP CTT Correios de Portugal
 1st Stage 1 Circuit de Lorraine
 8th Overall La Tropicale Amissa Bongo
1st Stage 5
2010
 1st Stage 3 Tour Down Under
 3rd Trofeo Cala Millor
 3rd Trofeo Magaluf-Palmanova
 5th Trofeo Palma
2011
 1st Stage 4 Volta a Catalunya
 8th Vattenfall Cyclassics
2012
 1st  Road race, National Road Championships
 1st Stage 1 Vuelta a Castilla y León
 4th Trofeo Palma
 4th Trofeo Migjorn
2013
 Volta a Portugal
1st  Points classification
1st Stage 5
2014
 Tour du Maroc
1st Points classification
1st Stages 1, 7, 8 & 9
 1st Stage 3 Volta ao Alentejo
 1st Stage 10 Volta a Portugal
2015
 5th Overall Volta ao Alentejo
1st Stage 2

Gallery

References

External links 
Profile at Cycling News website
Profile and results at Cycling Quotient website

1983 births
Living people
Portuguese male cyclists
Cyclists at the 2012 Summer Olympics
Olympic cyclists of Portugal
People from Paços de Ferreira
Sportspeople from Porto District